Electoral history of Gerald Ford, who served as the 38th president of the United States (1974–1977), the 40th vice president (1973–1974); and as a United States representative from Michigan (1949–1973).

Congressional elections (1948–1972)

1948

1950

1952

1954

1956

1958

1960

1962

1964

1966

1968

1970

1972

Speaker of the House elections (1965–1973)

1965

1967

1969

1971

1973

Vice presidential confirmation (1973)

Presidential election (1976)

Notes

References

Gerald Ford
Ford, Gerald
Ford, Gerald